Hicham Arazi (born 19 October 1973) is a Moroccan former professional tennis player.  He played professionally from 1993 to the end of 2007. The left-hander reached his career-high ATP singles ranking of world No. 22 on November 5, 2001. During his career, Arazi captured one ATP Tour singles title, in Casablanca. "The Moroccan Magician" reached the quarter-finals of the Australian Open twice and the French Open twice. Some tennis analysts also called him "The Moroccan McEnroe" due to his talent – he played with incredible touch, and often enjoyed the support of the crowd even when not at home. He led Patrick Rafter, winner of the US Open in 1997 and 1998, two sets to love during the first round of the latter tournament. In the fourth set he was upset with several line calls, telling umpire Norm Chryst to "get out of here", which sparked the beginning of Arazi's meltdown (and Rafter's comeback). During his career, he notably gained victories over former world No. 1s and major champions Roger Federer, Andre Agassi, Yevgeny Kafelnikov, Marat Safin, Lleyton Hewitt, Juan Carlos Ferrero, Carlos Moyá and Jim Courier.

ATP Masters Series finals

Singles (1 runner-up)

Career finals

Singles (1 title, 2 runners-up)

Doubles (2 runners-up)

Singles performance timeline

1This event was held in Essen in 1995, and in Stuttgart from 1996 through 2001.

References

External links
 
 
 

1973 births
Living people
Moroccan male tennis players
Olympic tennis players of Morocco
People from Monte Carlo
Moroccan expatriate sportspeople in Monaco
Sportspeople from Casablanca
Tennis players at the 1996 Summer Olympics
Tennis players at the 2004 Summer Olympics